Chandod or Chanod is a village in Dabhoi taluka, Vadodara district, in the Indian state of Gujarat.

Geography 
It is located at the convergence of the Narmada, Orsang, and Saraswati rivers. The village is considered sacred by many and includes temples such as the kapileshwar mahadev, seshasinarayan mandir, pingleshwar mahadev,  Kashi Vishwanath Mahadev. It is a major pilgrim site of Hindus for performing last rites of their dead.

Demographics 
According to the 2001 census of India, the total population of the village was 3019: 1530 males and 1489 females.

References

Villages in Vadodara district